Hagnell is a Swedish surname. Notable people with the surname include:

Hans Hagnell (1919–2006), Swedish politician and economist
Olle Hagnell (1924–2011), Swedish psychiatrist and epidemiologist, cousin of Hans

See also
Hignell

Swedish-language surnames